Sisila Gini Gani (Fire on Ice) is a 1992 Sri Lankan, Sinhala language film. It was the first film directed by Prasanna Vithanage. The film stars Sanath Gunathilake and Sabeetha Perera in lead roles along with Veena Jayakody and Asoka Peiris.

Sisila Gini Gani had a short run in Sri Lanka. The music for the film was composed by Dr. Premasiri Khemadasa. It made a great impression on the audience. The film won 9 OCIC awards in 1992 including Best Director, Best Actor and Actress, 7 Swarna Sanka Awards including Best Director and 2 Sarasavi Awards. The film was screened again at the Regal Cinema Colombo on a limited engagement basis in October 2002.

Plot
Harris Makalanda (Sanath Gunathilake) is a wealthy aristocrat and well known lawyer. He is also a married man to Kumari (Veena Jayakody). One day he meets a beautiful girl, Annette (Sabeetha Perera), at a party. He meets her again when she hitches a ride with him during a heavy rain storm, which leads to a sexual encounter between them.

She is of Sri Lankan Burgher ethnicity; her family background and experiences with married men convince her to shun marriage, which she sees as imprisonment. As their liaison grows, Harris invites Annette to live in his separate bungalow, which she agrees to. Along with renovating the dilapidated bungalow, Annette seems to renovate her notion on marriage, and expresses this to Harris.

Meanwhile, Harris is contesting the municipal elections, at the urging of his wife and in-laws. His schedule leaves him no time for Annette but she continues to relish his company. The only obstacle in Annette's path to possessing Harris, completely and permanently, is Harris' little boy, Vijitha. Harris' son has special needs, acting as the glue in Kumari and Harris' marriage of convenience.

Annette tries to establish a rapport with the son. Once when the child goes on a picnic with his school friends, Annette separates him from the others as a sudden mist rolls in. Frightened, the child runs away. She sees him heading for the abyss but as hard as she tries, she is unable to stop him.  This is the crux of the movie, allowing the story to pivot into flashbacks and flash forwards.

Cast
 Sanath Gunathilake as Harris Makalanda
 Sabeetha Perera as Annette
 Veena Jayakody as Kumari Makalanda
 Asoka Peiris as Frank Dunuwila
 Tony Ranasinghe as Inspector Arthur Silva
 Hemasiri Liyanage as Missionary
 Thalatha Gunasekara as Mrs. Dunuwilla
 Jayalath Manoratne as Medawatta
 G.W. Surendra as Newspaper editor
 Nawanandana Wijesinghe as Martin
 Chandani Seneviratne as Nun
 Neil Alles as Opposition Leader
 Dilani Abeywardana as TV announcer
 Daya Thennakoon as Watchman
 Indrajith Navinna as Bystander
 Ebert Wijesinghe

Awards
 OCIC Awards 1992
 Best Director
 Best Actress
 Best Actor
 Best Supporting Actress
 Best Music Director
 Best Cameraman
 Best Art Director
 Best Laboratory Work
Swarna Sanka Awards 1992
 Best Film
 Best Director
 Best Actress
 Best Music Director
 Best Cameraman (Black and White)
 Best Art Director 
 Best Producer

References

Films set in Sri Lanka (1948–present)
1992 directorial debut films
1992  films
1990s Sinhala-language films
Films directed by Prasanna Vithanage